is a Japanese cross-country skier. He competed in the men's sprint event at the 2002 Winter Olympics.

References

1974 births
Living people
Japanese male cross-country skiers
Olympic cross-country skiers of Japan
Cross-country skiers at the 2002 Winter Olympics
Sportspeople from Nagano Prefecture
Cross-country skiers at the 1996 Asian Winter Games